The qualifying campaign for the 1901–02 FA Cup, the thirty-first staging of the world's oldest association football competition, consisted of six rounds of matches, which began on 21 September 1901 with the preliminary round. The Cup was eventually won by Sheffield United, who beat Southampton in the final.

Matches were scheduled to be played at the stadium of the team named first on the date specified for each round, which was always a Saturday. If scores were level after 90 minutes had been played, a replay would take place at the stadium of the second-named team later the same week. If the replayed match was drawn further replays would be held at neutral venues until a winner was determined.

Tournament calendar

Preliminary round

First qualifying round

Second qualifying round

Third qualifying round

Fourth qualifying round

Fifth qualifying round

References
The FA Cup results archive at TheFA.com

Qualifying Rounds